MetCC, also known as the Met Contact Centre, Met Command and Control or MO12, is a department of Met Operations within Greater London's Metropolitan Police Service. It is responsible for receiving emergency and non-emergency public telephony within the Metropolitan Police and between the police and the public & other forces, and for the despatching of police to incidents. MetCC operates out of three centres in Lambeth, Hendon and Bow.

Previous command and control system
Historically, each of the Met's Borough Operational Command Units (BOCUs) had its own control room, known internally as the 'CAD Room' (for Computer Aided Despatch) which dealt with incoming non-emergency calls and with despatching police to all calls in that area. In addition, the Information Room at New Scotland Yard received 999 calls which were sent to the CAD Room to be dealt with. In 2004, staff began to migrate on a borough-by-borough basis to Metcall, with Southwark being the first BOCU to move.

The C3i programme
Led by DAC Ron McPherson and Dr Amanat Hussain,  the C3i programme (Communication, Command, Control & Information) was the largest police transformation programme undertaken in the UK. Working with Chief Superintendent Stephen MacDonald, the Operational Command Unit (OCU) Commander for MetCC, the C3i programme modernised the command and control infrastructure to create seamless communications service for the Metropolitan Police Service to give the people of London a robust and resilient response policing service, getting the right people in the right place at the right time with the right information. The C3i Programme  delivered optimised end to end Command and Control processes, new operational command unit (Central Communications Command), new Casualty Bureau Facility, largest Special Operations Room, Integrated Borough Operations Rooms and Telephone Investigation Bureaus services.

Despite criticisms of public sector programme, the MPS successfully delivered a complex organisation transformation programme. The Office of Government Commerce (OGC) in their final report said that "C3i has been well managed and has been delivered to time and to budget programme" and went on to commend the senior programme management team for having  "done an excellent job, particularly as the implementation has been into a live operational environment".

New command and control system

Following completion of the C3i programme in late 2007, all Met communications are dealt with at three dedicated centres at Hendon, Bow and Lambeth, covering west; north and east; and south London respectively. Within each centre is a call receipt facility, called First Contact and a dispatching facility called Dispatch. In First Contact call takers sit in pods of twelve positions, each pod having its own supervisor. Dispatching pods have two or three dispatcher and one  supervisor position. The size of the dispatching pod depends on how busy the borough that it supports is. Patrol officers are dispatched through the Airwave radios and by sending information direct to the MDT terminal in every police vehicle.

Call handling
Any caller calling police will be passed to a First Contact operator. If the call needs to be recorded by the police, a record is made on the Contact Handling System, a tailored iteration of the AIT Portrait CRM product. If an officer needs to be dispatched, this record is passed into the Computer Aided Despatch (CAD) application, and a CAD record will be created.

Graded response
Once the initial information has been inputted, the CAD will be allocated a grade of urgency. All calls are given one of four grades:
Immediate (I) grade - 'I' grade calls are calls where "the immediate presence of a police officer will have a significant impact on the outcome of an incident". This is typically categorised as where there is, or is likely to be, a danger to life, a serious threat of violence, serious damage to property or serious injury. The response time to a call of this urgency is 15 minutes.
Significant (S) grade - 'S' grade calls are calls where there is a "degree of importance or urgency associated with the initial police action, but an emergency response is not required". The response time to a call of this urgency is 60 minutes.
Extended (E) grade - 'E' grade calls are calls where a police attendance is required, but an emergency police response is not. The response time to a call of this urgency is 48 hours.
Referred (R) grade - 'R' grade calls are calls where a police attendance is not required. This typically means that the caller has been dealt with appropriately by the call handler.

Once the CAD report has been created, it is passed to the relevant Dispatch for the borough in question to decide what officers to deploy to it. The Supervisor (see below) can change the grading of the call if necessary, but only in exceptional circumstances.

During the programme transition there were a number of challenges with late technology and the preparedness of staff to work in the new environment, and not all performance targets were met. As the new OCU bedded down, performance consolidated and the command now achieves all of the national call handling targets set by the Home Office through the HMIC and NPIA.

Integrated Borough Operations (IBO) units, originally set up in Borough Commands to support local officers have been closed, and their functions have been absorbed into MetCC.

Contact Handling System
The Contact Handling System (CHS) is a software application intended to provide more information to call handlers when taking emergency calls.

CHS differs from the older CAD system and from systems used by other emergency services worldwide in that far more information can be input into the system by the CAD Operator and the information can be retrieved and sorted more easily. However, it has proven unpopular thus far with CAD Operators and Police Officers; operators consider it unnecessarily complicated to use, and police find CHS-derived information difficult to interpret, particularly via MDT terminal.

It was intended that CHS be brought into place upon each OCU/BOCU's transfer to the Central Communications Command. However, the system proved unstable and incapable of dealing with high call volumes and the old CAD system was kept in place. It is now intended that the two systems run in parallel until 2012.

Criticism of the new 'CHS' system
Central Communications Command hit the headlines in 2006, when Peter Smyth, a spokesman for the Police Federation condemned the Contact Handling System by describing it as "at best unreliable, and that's if it works at all". He added that "Metcall will have taken 900 officers off the beat by the end of next year, and meanwhile, an ever-growing army of community support officers who walk around like gaggles of lost shoppers have been recruited to take the places of these experienced officers in the streets".

Press reaction to MetCC and the C3i programme 
The local press in London, particularly the Evening Standard, were initially very critical of Metcall, often citing concerns about the perceived increase in the time taken to answer telephone calls and to deploy police officers to incidents. The reality since 2009 is that the MPS performance in answering emergency and non emergency telephony has seen significant improvement, particularly with non emergency telephony.
A number of local newspapers have also raised concerns about the loss of local knowledge due to operators no longer dealing only with a single small area. It is hoped by MPS management that, following the completion of the transition to the Metcall centres and a subsequent stabilisation of staff turnover rates, any shortcomings will cease to be an issue and more efficient staff working will free up those police officers currently at MetCC to return to an operational role, further improving the MPS's efficiency.

Staff structure
Central Communications Command is unique within the Metropolitan Police in its staff structure. It is both the largest Operational Command Unit in the MPS (and the United Kingdom) and the only one where many of its operational roles are staffed by civilian staff. Consequently, it has a different structure to all other branches of the MPS.  MetCC retains sufficient police officers to maintain the 999 answering and Dispatch service should civilian staff strike, in posts identified as requiring a police officer in legislation, and in senior and intermediate positions where command is exercised.

Duty Officers
Each of the three Metcall centres has two Duty Officers on duty at any given time (making a total of six on duty across the three centres). One of the Duty Officers is always a serving Inspector, whilst the other is always an experienced member of the civilian staff. The Duty Officers bear ultimate responsibility for decisions taken within the centre, and are also responsible for staff welfare within their centre.

CAD Supervisors
Each "pod" - generally covering between two and four Operational Command Units - has two CAD Supervisors. Their role is to oversee the Operators, to take control of particularly difficult situations, and to have final say over when an incident can be 'closed'. In addition, one or two Supervisors will oversee the First Contact process (see above), ensuring calls are dealt with correctly. The role of Supervisor is filled either by a Sergeant or by an experienced member of the civilian staff.

Supervisors are commonly (but incorrectly) referred to as "Controllers"; the post of Controller was a historic post prior to the introduction of the C3i programme, and was responsible for the supervision and staff welfare of CAD Operators on a particular borough. On transition to Metcall centres, the majority of Controllers became Supervisors at Central Communications Command.

CAD Operators (Communications Officers)
CAD Operators (also known as Communications Officer or Civilian Communications Officer) make up the majority of operational MetCC staff. Most are civilian, although some posts are filled by Police Officers on secondment due to staff shortages. It was intended that by the end of 2007 the position would be entirely civilianised.

Job role
CAD Operators perform two functions. In the First Contact (FC) role (also known as call receipt), they answer 999 and non-emergency telephone calls to police and enter the details of the call onto the MPS computer system. In the Despatch role they read the details of the calls as entered by First Contact, decide on the appropriate action to take, and, when police deployment is necessary, assign police officers using Airwave radios or by sending information directly to the MDT terminal of police vehicles. Most CAD Operators rotate between the two roles, but some are dedicated to one or the other.

The title "CAD Operator" comes from the Computer Assisted Despatch program that the MPS has used since 1984; while this system is still in use, it is gradually being superseded by the new Contact Handling System application.

Location
On the introduction of the CAD system in 1986, each Metropolitan Police Division had a 'Reserve Room' with a 'Reserve Officer' using a paper based system to manage locally deployed resources. The 'Reserve Officer' recorded non emergency calls directly from calls to the police station, and received emergency (999) calls from a teleprinter which was connected to Information Room at Scotland Yard, where all of London's police 999 calls were received. Call volumes and demands at that time meant most stations had one or two 'Reserve' officers, smaller stations had one officer in the role.

As the new CAD system was rolled out the Reserve rooms were closed as each Division opened one or more CAD rooms. These were staffed by shifts of between three and seven police officers and civil staff.

In 2004, local CAD Operators began to transfer to the new Metcall centres; the transfer was completed in December 2007.

Operator numbers
There are just over 2,000 CAD Operator positions within the MPS, and approximately 400-500 theoretically on duty at any given time. Due to staffing issues stemming from the transfer to the Metcall centres, the numbers are currently much lower, and a number of police officers have been seconded to Central Communications Command to fill vacancies; this removal of officers from active duties led to some controversy. While the Metropolitan Police Authority intended to eventually have all CAD Operator positions filled by civilians, allowing police officers to return to active duties, this civilianisation was stopped in 2010 as it was recognised by the MPS that total civilianisation would create a significant risk to London if the MetCC staff went on strike and police officers (who cannot strike by law) were not trained and familiar with MetCC processes.

Staff shortages
When the C3i program began to be implemented in 2004, it was extremely controversial both within and outside the Met. A number of staff were reluctant to relocate to the new centres, and were also concerned about the substantial changes to their job role. Due to concerns about large numbers of potential staff shortages, the controversial 'Career Management' scheme was introduced; this meant that for some time prior to the introduction of Central Communications Command all staff currently working in CAD Rooms were barred from transferring to any other department within the MPS. Despite this, a number of existing staff resigned from the service altogether rather than transfer and serving officers are reluctant to transfer to Central Communications Command due to concerns they may not be released for some time. Notwithstanding this, the staff 'churn' rates of around 12% in MetCC compares very favourably with similarly sized commercial call centres which often have churn rates in excess of 30%.

See also
Central Operations
FiReControl
FireLink
Gold Silver Bronze command structure
The Job (police newspaper)

References

External links
Photograph of MPS Traffic Control showing a typical CAD environment

Metropolitan Police units